Labeo djourae is a species of freshwater fish belonging to the genus Labeo. It is endemic to the Benue River in Chad. It is sometimes considered conspecific with Labeo parvus.

References

djourae
Fish described in 1960